La Boîte à merveilles is an autobiographical 1954 novel by Moroccan writer Ahmed Sefrioui.

Background
It was long thought to be the first mainstream Moroccan novel written in the French language. 
The novel presents a slice of life within the context of North African Francophone literature of the century.

The book follows the Maghreb tradition of an autobiographical style, written in the first person. It explores, through an adult's memories of commonplace events in his childhood, his perception and emotional relationship with his parents. Surrounded by the love, passion and drama of life, in quiet times the boy can always return to his secret box of marvels. The novel has been recognized by critics as exceptional in style and content. It has been described as a classic work.

The novel has been used as a vehicle for teaching French to students of Maghrebian origin, since they can more easily relate to the experiences of the author than they would to books written by and about French people.

Extracts from the book have been used for the first year Baccalauréat examinations by the French and Moroccan ministries of Education.

Story
The narrator adult, plagued by loneliness begins his story to better understand dating his long-lasting solitude. He then presents the tenants of Dar chouafa: lalla Kenza the seer (ground floor), Driss El Aouad, his wife Rahma and their daughter Zineb (first floor) and fatma Bziouya the second floor). It evokes memories Moorish Bath and its Wonders box where the objects found there to keep him company. Then he recounts memories of a dispute between his mother and Rahma.

Returning from m'sid, the narrator finds his ailing mother .. Lalla Aicha, her friend, comes to visit and manages to convince her to visit Sidi Boughaleb. At the end of the visit, Sidi Mohamed gets scratched by a cat. Tired, the child does not go m'sid the following day, and describes the morning routine at home while evoking the origin of their parents, and the memory of the nasty Driss, apprenticed to his father.

The narrator recounts his day at Msid. In the evening, noting that Fatima Bziouiya lights with an oil lamp, Lalla Zoubida insists that her husband bought one of which is the following day. He then narrates the disappearance of zineb, and how his mother managed to find her at home Idrissides. Rahma, as an act of grace to God, prepares a meal for beggars. All the neighbors get involved with a good heart.

The first days of spring, Lalla msirina and her son visits Lalla Aicha. Sidi Mohamed takes on the opportunity to play with the neighbors' children. Lalla Aicha then tells her friend the misfortunes of her husband with his partner Abdelkader. The next day, the mother reported the story of her husband. This will raise in the small Sidi Mohamed memories of the grocer Abdellah who would tell him stories.

On a Wednesday, the Fquih explains to his students his plans for Ashura. At home, Lalla Zoubida doesn’t get tired of recounting the misfortunes of Lalla Aicha to Fatima and Rahma and makes them promise to keep the secret. Afterwards, the narrator recounts the memory of the death of Sidi Tahar Ben billion. As he had attended the scene, the child got nightmares the following night.

During the preparations for the Ashura Msid the Fquih organizes the work and form teams. The small Sidi Mohamed was appointed head of the brushes. The next morning, he accompanied his mother to kissaria to buy a new jacket. Back home, Sidi Mohamed argues with Zineb. Sa mother angry. Sad and taken Hunger, the child plunges into her dreams. The narrator then tells us the story of Lalla Khadija and her husband's uncle Othman told the neighbors by Rhima.

On the eve of Ashura, women buy drums and a trumpet Sidi Mohamed. He participates in Msid preparations for the feast. The next day, he accompanied his father to the hairdresser where he listens without interest to adult conversations.

The day of Ashura, the child wakes up early and put his new clothes before going to m'sid celebrate this special day .. After the meal, Lalla Aicha comes to visit the family of the narrator.
After Ashura, life regains its monotony. But with the first warm days, the mother declares war on bedbugs. One day, the narrator's father decides to take his wife and son to the souk to buy jewelry bracelets. Fatma Bziouya accompanied the family of the narrator arrives at jewelers souk but the father is the face all bloody after a fight with a broker. Lalla Zubaida, superstitious, does not want these bracelets, she thinks they are evil. Mother Lalla Aicha tells the misadventures of the souk. Sidi Mohamed sick.

The father lost all his capital. He decides to sell the bracelets and go to work at around Fez. Sidi Mohamed still suffering from fever. Father's departure is Véu as a great drama. One day, the mother visits her friend Lalla Aicha, who offered him to consult a soothsayer: If elArafi.
the narrator evokes memories of seeing if Elarafi. Lalla Zoubida returns home while keeping the secret of the visit ... she decides to keep her child at home and take each week to visit a marabout.

One morning she was visited by a messenger from her husband. Lalla Aicha just ask his girlfriend to visit him the next day because she has something to tell him.

In Lalla Aicha, women talk. It is visited by Salama, who recounts his role in the marriage of the daughter Larbi If the hairdresser and the problems of the new couple.

The narrator in this last chapter recounts the return of his father. Sidi Mohamed tells his father past events during his absence. The narrator's father learns that M.Larbi broke with his young wife. Sidi Mohamed, still at the beginning and also solitary dreamer, takes out his box and wonders lulled by his dreams

References

Further reading

 

 Amy Tikkanen, La Boîte à merveilles, Encyclopædia Britannica

External links

1954 Moroccan novels
Autobiographical novels
Éditions du Seuil books
French-language novels
Moroccan novels
Novels set in Morocco